Myra Kelly (1875–1910) was an Irish American schoolteacher and author.

Life
Kelly was born in Dublin, she came to the United States with her father, a physician who established a practice on the Lower East Side of Manhattan. She attended the Horace Mann School and Teachers College, Columbia University, graduating in 1899.

Kelly taught elementary school at Public School 147 from 1899 to 1901. She produced three collections of stories based on her experiences as a teacher. Her character Constance Bailey teaches Irish and Russian Jewish immigrant children. A minor theme within her works is the changing character of the neighborhood and the displacement of Irish immigrant families. After the publishing of her "In Loco Parentis", US President Theodore Roosevelt wrote her a letter of appreciation.

Kelly married Allan Macnaughton in 1905. Prior to her death, she also wrote the romance novels Rosnah and The Golden Season.

Kelly developed tuberculosis and died on March 30, 1910 in Torquay, England. She was 35 years old.

Works
Little Citizens, The Humours of School Life (1905)
The Isle of Dreams (1907)
Wards of Liberty (1907)
Rosnah (1908)
The Golden Season (1909)
Little Aliens (1910)

References

External links

1875 births
1910 deaths
20th-century American novelists
Horace Mann School alumni
Irish emigrants to the United States (before 1923)
Teachers College, Columbia University alumni
American expatriates in England
American women novelists
20th-century American women writers
Novelists from New York (state)